Robinson Reichel (born 16 May 1966) is a German television actor.

Selected filmography
 Derrick - Season 10, Episode 06: "Tödliches Rendezvous" (1983)
 Die Wächter (1986, TV miniseries), as Collins
  (2002), as a Roland

External links

ZBF Agency Cologne 

1966 births
Living people
German male television actors
German male film actors